Harry Weaving Greenwood is an Australian actor.

Early life and education
Harry Greenwood is the son of actor Hugo Weaving.

Career
Greenwood has appeared in feature films The Nightingale (2018) and True History of the Kelly Gang (2019), and in television series including Gallipoli and Bad Mothers.

He is also a stage actor, appearing in Cat on a Hot Tin Roof at the Roslyn Packer Theatre, and Sydney Theatre Company's Cloud Nine.
 
Greenwood stars in Sean Lahiff's debut film as director, Carnifex.  A science fiction / horror film with large-scale special effects, the film also stars Alexandra Park and Sisi Stringer, and is due to premiere at the Adelaide Film Festival in October 2022.

Filmography

Film

Awards and nominations
For his role in Wakefield he was nominated for the 2021 AACTA Award for Best Guest or Supporting Actor in a Television Drama.

References

External links
 

Living people
Australian male film actors
Australian male stage actors
Australian male television actors
Year of birth missing (living people)